Nominate reports, also known as nominative reports, named reports and private reports, is a legal term from common-law jurisdictions referring to the various published collections of reports of English cases in various courts from the Middle Ages to the 1860s, when law reporting was officially taken over by the Incorporated Council of Law Reporting, for example Edmund F. Moore's Reports of Cases Heard and Determined by the Judicial Committee and the Lords of His Majesty's most Honourable Privy Council on Appeal from the Supreme and Sudder Dewanny Courts in the East Indies published in London from 1837 to 1873, referred to as Moore's Indian Appeals and cited for example as: Moofti Mohummud Ubdoollah v. Baboo Mootechund 1 M.I.A. 383.

Most (but not all) are reprinted in the English Reports.

They are described as "nominate" in order to distinguish them from the Year Books, which are anonymous.

List

Acton
Addams
Adolphus and Ellis
Aleyn
Ambler
Anderson
Andrews
Anstruther
Atkyns
Barnardiston's Chancery Reports
Barnardiston's King's Bench Reports
Barnes
Barnewall and Adolphus 
Barnewall and Alderson
Barnewall and Cresswell
Beavan
Bell
Bellewe
Benloe
Benloe and Dalison
Best and Smith
Bingham
Bingham, New Cases
Blackstone, Henry
Blackstone, William
Bligh
Bligh, New Series
Bosanquet and Puller
Bosanquet and Puller, New Reports
Bridgman, Sir J.
Bridgeman, Sir O.
Broderip and Bingham
Brook's New Cases
Browning and Lushington
Brown's Chancery Cases (Belt)
Brown's Parliament Cases
Brownlow and Goldsborough
Bulstrode
Bunberry
Burrell
Burrow
Calthorpe
Campbell
Carrington and Kirwan
Carrington and Marsham
Carrington and Payne
Carter
Carthew
Cary
Cases in Chancery
Choyce Cases in Chancery
Clark and Finelly
Coke's Reports
Colles
Collyer
Comberbach
The Common Bench Reports
The Common Bench Reports, New Series
Comyns
Cooke
Cooper's Practice Cases
Cooper, G
Cooper, temp Brougham
Cooper, temp Cottenham
Cowper
Cox
Craig and Phillips
Croke, Eliz.
Croke, Jac.
Croke, Car.
Crompton and Jervis
Crompton and Meeson
Crompton, Meeson and Roscoe
Cunningham
Curteis
Daniell
Davis, Ireland
Deane and Swabey
Dearsly
Dearsly and Bell
De Gex, Fisher and Jones
De Gex, Jones and Smith
De Gex, M'Naghten and Gorden
De Gex and Smale
Denison
Dickens
Dodson
Donnelly
Douglas
Dow
Dow and Clark
Dowling and Ryland
Drewry
Drewry and Smale
Dyer
East
Eden
Edwards
Ellis and Blackburn
Ellis and Blackburn and Ellis
Ellis and Ellis
Equity Cases Abridged
Espinasse's Reports
The Exchequer Reports (Welsby, Hurlstone and Gordon)
Fitzgibbon
Forrest
Fortescue
Foster's Crown Cases
Foster and Finlason
Freeman's Chancery Reports
Freeman's King's Bench Reports
Giffard
Gibert's Cases in Law and Equity
Gilbert
Godbolt
Gouldsborough
Gow
Haggard's Admiralty Reports
Haggard's Consistory Reports
Haggard's Ecclesiastical Reports
Hall and Twells
Hardes
Hardwicke, cases temp
Hare
Hay and Marriott
Hemming and Miller
Hetley
Hobart
Holt, Nisi Prius
Holt, Equity
Holt, King's Bench
House of Lords Cases (Clark)
Hurlstone and Coltman
Hurlstone and Newman
Hutton
Jacob
Jacob and Walker
Jenkins (Eight centuries of cases)
Johnson
Johnson and Hemming
Jones, T
Jones, W
Kay
Kay and Johnson
Keble
Keen
Keilway
Kelyng
Kenyon
Knapp
Lane
Latch
Leach
Lee
Leigh and Cave
Leonard
Levinz
Lewin's Crown Cases on the Northern Circuit
Ley
Lilly-Assize
Littleton
Lofft
Lushington
Lutwyche
Maclaen and Robinson
M'Cleland
M'Cleland and Younge
M'Naghten and Gordon
Maddock
Manning and Granger
March, New Cases
Maule and Selwyn
Meeson and Welsby
Merivale
The Modern Reports
Moody's Crown Cases Reserved
Moody and Malkin
Moody and Robinson
Moore, King's Bench
Moore, Privy Council
Moore, Privy Council, New Series
Moore's Indian Appeals
Mosely
Mylne and Craig
Mylne and Keen
Nelson
Noy
Owen
Palmer
Parker
Peake
Peake, Additional Cases
Peere Williams
Philimore
Phillips
Plowden's Commentaries
Pollexfen
Popham
Port
Precedents in Chancery (T Finch)
Price
The Queen's Bench Reports
Lord Raymond's Reports
Raymond, Sir T
Reports in Chancery
Reports, temp Finch
Ridgeway, temp Hardwicke
Robertson
Robinson, C
Robinson, W
Rolle
Russell
Russell and Mylne
Russell and Ryan
Ryan and Moody
Salkfield
Saunders (edition by Peere Williams is called William's Saunders)
Saville
Sayer
Searle and Smith
Select Cases, temp King
Session Cases
Shower, House of Lords
Shower, King's Bench
Siderfin
Simons
Simons, New Series
Simons and Stuart
Skinner
Smale and Giffard
Spelman
Spinks
Spinks' Prize Cases
Starkie
The State Trials (Cobbett and Howell)
The State Trials, New Series (Macdonell)
Strange
Style
Swabey
Swabey and Tristram
Swanston
Talbot, cases temp
Tamyln
Taunton
The Term Reports (Durnford and East)
Tothill
Turner and Russell
Vaughan
Ventris
Vernon
Vesey Senior
Vesey Senior, supplement by Belt
Vesey Junior
Vesey Junior, supplement by Hovenden
Vesey and Beams
West
West, temp Hardwicke
Wightwick
Willes
Wilmot
Wilson
Wilson, Chancery
Wilson, King's Bench
Winch
Yelverton
Younge
Younge and Collyer
Younge and Collyer C C
Younge and Jervis

See also 
 Law report: England and Wales

References
Wallace, John William. The Reporters. Third Edition Revised. T & J W Johnson. Philadelphia. 1855. Digitised copy from Google Books.
 J. W. Wallace, The Reporters, 4th ed., 1882
 John Charles Fox, Handbook of English Law Reports, 1913, Internet Archive
 William Thomas Shave Daniel, History and Origin of the Law Reports (London, 1884)  
Clarence Gabriel Moran. The Heralds of the Law. London. 1948.
Van Vechten Veeder, "The English Reports, 1292-1865" (1901) 15 Harvard Law Review 1 and 109; reprinted at 2 Select Essays in Anglo American Legal History 123  
L W Abbott. Law Reporting in England 1485-1585. (University of London Legal Series No 10). The Athlone Press. London. 1973.
William Searle Holdsworth. "Law Reporting in the Nineteenth and Twentieth Centuries". Anglo-American Legal History Series, No. 5 (1941). Reprinted in Goodhart and Hanbury (eds) Essays in Law and History, by Sir William S Holdsworth, Clarendon Press, Oxford, 1946, reprinted by The Lawbook Exchange Limited (Union, New Jersey) 1995. Page 284 et seq.
Chantal Stebbings (ed). Law Reporting in Britain: Proceedings of the Eleventh British Legal History Conference. 1995. Hambledon Press. . Google Books. Chapters 5 and 7 to 9.

Notes

Legal terminology
Legal research